Big Innings: The Best of the Outfield is the second greatest hits collection by British pop rock band The Outfield, featuring tracks from various albums released from 1985 onwards, together with some unreleased material.

AllMusic's review says "Big Innings is a more-than-sufficient hits package."

Track listing

Track information and credits taken from the album's liner notes.

References

External links 
The Outfield's official Site
Sony Records Official Site

The Outfield compilation albums
1996 greatest hits albums
Albums produced by David Kahne